Iipumbu ya Tshilongo (1875–1959) was king of the Uukwambi, an Ovambo clan in Namibia, from 1907 to 1932. He is one of the national heroes of Namibia.

Biography
Iipumbu ya Tshilongo was born in 1873 in Onatshiku, a settlement near Elim, today in the Omusati Region of northern Namibia. An accident as adolescent earned him the nickname Ndilimani (Oshiwambo: dynamite) when an explosion blew three fingers off his left hand.

He became the eighteenth king of the Uukwambi in 1907, succeeding king Negumbo lya Kandenge. During his reign he became known to jealously protect the tribal area of the Uukwambi from encroaching white settlers, going as far as having the roads guarded that led into Uukwambi territory.

Ya Tshilongo also resisted European cultural influence exercised via the establishment of mission stations and administrative outposts. Having rebuked the Finnish Missionary Society and the South West African Administration for years, he only allowed the Catholic Church to establish a station at Oshikuku in 1924. He ignored the Administration's request to send contract labourers, refused to pay taxes, and was generally uncooperative towards the authorities.

Oral history and archival records characterise ya Tshilongo as a despotic tyrant who ruled with an iron fist. He had many of his subjects flee his influence, including his own daughter, Neekulu ya Shivute. Both his stubbornness towards the authorities and his questionable way to rule led to a decision to topple him. In 1932, troops under Resident Commissioner Hahn attacked the Uukwambi during his absence and had his homestead at Onashiku bombed with military aircraft.

Iipumpu ya Tshilongo was later arrested and forced into exile to Kavango. He returned in 1938 to Amupolo due to illness. Ya Tshilongo died in Oshikuku on 9 September 1959.

Recognition
Iipumbu ya Tshilongo is one of nine national heroes of Namibia that were identified at the inauguration of the country's Heroes' Acre near Windhoek. Founding president Sam Nujoma remarked in his inauguration speech on 26 August 2002 that:
Chief Iipumbu ya Tshilongo was a true Namibian nationalist ruler who rejected the idea to pay taxes to the South Africa colonial authorities and who refused to cooperate with them. He also did not allow the missionaries to gain any influence over him or his people. [...] His resistance and strong nationalistic character inspired many
people, even in his absence, to continue with the anti-colonial struggle. [...] To his revolutionary spirit and his visionary memory we humbly offer our honor and respect.
Ya Tshilongo is honoured in form of a granite tombstone with his name engraved and his portrait plastered onto the slab. His homestead in Onashiku was proclaimed a national monument in 2014. The site has been deproclaimed a few month later.

References

1875 births
1959 deaths
People from Omusati Region
National heroes of Namibia
Namibian revolutionaries